The 1913 VFL Grand Final was an Australian rules football game contested between the Fitzroy Football Club and St Kilda Football Club, held at the Melbourne Cricket Ground in Melbourne on 27 September 1913. It was the 16th annual grand final of the Victorian Football League, staged to determine the premiers for the 1913 VFL season. The match, attended by 59,556 spectators, was won by Fitzroy by a margin of 13 points, marking that club's fifth premiership victory.

It was St Kilda's first ever grand final appearance and they struggled early, not kicking a goal until the third quarter. A last quarter burst from St Kilda had them within two points when George Morrissey goaled. A mark to Des Baird looked like giving the Saints the lead but he handpassed it to Morrissey who was covered by his opponent and he could only kick a behind. Two late goals to Fitzroy sealed the game.

Teams

 Umpire - Jack Elder

Statistics

Goalkickers

Attendance
 MCG crowd - 59,556

References
1913 VFL Grand Final statistics
 The Official statistical history of the AFL 2004 
 Ross, J. (ed), 100 Years of Australian Football 1897-1996: The Complete Story of the AFL, All the Big Stories, All the Great Pictures, All the Champions, Every AFL Season Reported, Viking, (Ringwood), 1996.

See also
 1913 VFL season

VFL/AFL Grand Finals
Grand
Fitzroy Football Club
St Kilda Football Club
September 1913 sports events